The Princes of Malibu is an American reality television series which premiered on Fox on July 10, 2005. There were six episodes broadcast; the first two aired on Fox, and the remaining four aired on Fox Reality Channel. It starred Brody Jenner and Brandon Jenner.

Synopsis
The series followed Brandon and Brody Jenner, the adult sons of Olympic champion Caitlyn Jenner and former Miss Tennessee USA Linda Thompson. On permanent vacation, the brothers lived with Linda and her husband, David Foster, in Foster's Malibu estate. Linda spoiled the boys, treated them as though they could do no wrong, while Foster wanted the "freeloaders" to get jobs and straighten their lives out. With their friend Spencer Pratt, the boys got themselves into various hijinks.

Production
The future of the series was thrown into doubt on July 11, 2005 when Thompson filed for divorce from Foster the day after the show premiered. Fox canceled the series after airing only two episodes. The remaining episodes were aired on Fox Reality Channel. It has since been featured on Channel V Australia, Living2 in the UK, and MuchMoreMusic in Canada. The Princes of Malibu: The Complete Series was released on DVD in July 2008.

On December 20, 2016, GRB Entertainment made the show available for streaming on YouTube.

Brody Jenner and Pratt became regulars on MTV's The Hills. In 2009, Jenner starred in his own reality show, Bromance. Brody and Brandon occasionally appeared on their once-stepmother Kris Jenner's reality show, Keeping Up with the Kardashians.

References

External links
 
 

2005 American television series debuts
2005 American television series endings
2000s American reality television series
English-language television shows
Fox Broadcasting Company original programming
Television shows related to the Kardashian–Jenner family
Television shows set in Malibu, California
Television series by GRB Entertainment